Mallappally (meaning "hill shrine" in Malayalam) is a taluk in Kerala state in India. It is one of the five taluks that make up the Pathanamthitta district. Historically a part of the kingdom of Travancore and Cochin. Called "Land of the BA graduates" due to English education imparted by the CMS College Kottayam in the 19th century, Mallappally is the original home of many Non-resident Indians, and has one of the lowest population growth and highest literacy rates in India.  It comes under the Thiruvalla Revenue Division & Thiruvalla Constituency. It is Located 18 km from Thiruvalla railway station and NH 183 in Thiruvalla. Buses leave every five minutes From Thiruvalla to Mallappally and vice versa.

Geography 
Most of the area is hilly with a midland climate. The Manimala River flows through the heart of the town and divides it into Mallappally West and Mallappally East. Mallappally taluk shares a border with Kottayam district at Nedungadappally along a river stream named Panayambala Thodu. From the Pathanamthitta, Kozhencherry, and Ranni side, the entrance to the town is at Mallappally Bridge.

Demographics 

Mallappally is the least populous sub-district in Pathanamthitta District, with 130,000 people. The nine villages of Mallappally, range from Kunnanthanam, the most populous with 21,000, and Telliyoor, the least populous with 8101 people. 64,000 (47%) of the taluk is male, while 70,000(53%) are female. The population of the sub-district has decreased by 2.1% in last ten years. The literacy rate, excluding children under 6, is 97%, and 98% of the male and 97% of the female population is literate. As with other areas of Kerala, Mallappally also depends on migrant labour. In Pathanamthitta, they constitute 35% of the labour force.

Syrian Christians (Malankara Mar Thoma Syrian Church, Malankara Orthodox Church, Malankara Catholics and CSI) and Christians form the majority of population in Mallappally. Christians (all denominations) constitute 61% (68,849) of the population. Hindus (all sects) constitute 34% (58,644) of the population. Muslims form 4%(6,194) and others, less than 1%.

Education Institutions 

Mar Dionysius School, CMS HSS, IHRD HS SCHOOL, GVHSS Keezhvaipur,NIRMAL JYOTHI Public School,MGD HSS Puthussery, Sophia International Academy Anicadu, Bishop Abraham Memorial (BAM) College Thurithicadu, Mar SEVERIOS College of Teacher Education Chengaroor, College of Applied Science (CAS) IHRD, College of Engineering Kallooppara, Central Engineering Institute & ITC, St Joseph's ITC, Mar Ivanios College For Advanced Studies Chengaroor, St.thomas college of advanced studies Parackathanam

Places of Worship 
Pazhaya Suriyani Pally (St Marys Syrian old Church), situated on the eastern bank of the river, is the oldest church close to the town.  Today the old heritage church, co-owned by the Orthodox Church and the Mar Thoma Church, has regular worship only on the fourth Sunday of every month (Mar Thoma Church). Its cemetery is open to members of the Orthodox and Marthoma denominations. Mallapally St Johns Orthodox Valiyapally, St Francis Malankara Catholic Church, Pathicadu St Peters and St Pauls Orthodox Cathedral, Pariyaram St Andrews Marthoma Church,  Thuruthicad Mar Thoma Church,Emmanuel Believers Eastern Church Mallapally,India Pentecostal Church Mallappally, The Pentecostal Mission Mallappally, Assemblies of God church Mallappally are also prominent churches in this area.

The Thirumalida Mahadeva temple sits on the eastern bank of the Manimala River. The Thirumalida temple is famous for its appearance, which is similar to the Kashi Vishwanath Temple and got its present importance with the development of Mallapally. During the month of Karkidakam (July–August), thousands of people visit the temple to offer karkkidaka vavubali. It is one of a few temples to celebrate Shivarathri on a riverbed.

Kalloppara church is one of the oldest Christian shrines in the taluk, founded in AD 1339 (Kollavarsham 515, Karkidam 3), second only to the Niranam Church in the area, established by Saint Thomas. Vaipur Church is the second oldest church after Kallooppara church and is one of the 116 churches which were forced to participate in the Udyamperoor (Diamper) synod held in 1599 for Romanisation of the Malankara Church convened under the Goan Inquisition by Bishop Meneze.

The famous Shivaparvathi temple Anikkattilammakshethram is also situated in this taluk. Pariyaram Sreekrishna Swami temple, one of the most famous temples of Sree Krishna is about 3 km from Mallappally Town, is another attraction. Another famous Shivaparvathi temple, Sree Nadarajaswami Temple, is situated in Powathippady, Mallappally taluk. The Kallooppara Bhagavathy temple is situated close to the Kalloppara church, demonstrating the centuries-old religious harmony prevailing in the area. Most of the temples in Mallapally are dedicated to Shiva such as Vaipur Mahadeva Temple. A famous Hanuman temple is at near by Kaviyoor and other noted places of worship include the St. George Orthodox Church in Chengaroor, the St. Peter and St. Paul church in Pathicadu, the St. George Malankara Catholic Church in Chengaroor, and Holy Emmanul CSI Church.

Temples in keezhvaipur 
Eeswaramangalam Mahadeva temple and Kizhakkedath Sree Subrahmania Swami temple are also famous. Two temples are 200 m apart. Thiruvulsam in Sree Subrahmania Swami temple is conducted for ten days from malayalam star krithika in dhanu. Devotees from various places come for kodiyett day for getting the blessing of Deshathipathy on his special day.child and youth bhava of Lord Muruga facing in eastern and western side in a single sreekovil is an importance of this temple which is very rare in kerala."Skanthashashti" is another event in which thousands of devotees come to get blessings during this day(First shashti in Thulam).

Mallappally Thirumalida Temple, Anikkattilamma Siva Parvathy Temple, Powathippady Sree Nadarajaswami Temple, Pariyaram Sreekrishnaswami temple, Vaipur Shiva Temple are some of the major temples in the region.
Sree Narayana Gurudeva Kshethram owned by SNDP Yogam is situated near Revenue tower Mallappally.

In the 19th century, Anglican missionaries established a church and school adjacent to the old St Marys church. A section of old Syrian Christians joined them. Later, during the reformation movement started by Palakunnathu Abraham Malpan, a large section of Syrian Christians joined him. Roman Catholicism reached Mallapally only after 1930 due to Mallapally's interior location.

During the Travancore period, the first Pulayar convert to Christianity was a man named Habel, who was born on 5 May 1816, in Kaipatta, Mallapally. His Dravidian name was Daivathan (man of God). His wife was named Poovom. They had a son Uthayan (rising sun) and a daughter Chothi (Jyothi, lit. flame); all were baptised on the same day, 6 September 1854. Following his baptism, Habel studied theology under European tutors and travelled far and wide establishing congregations and churches. He spread Christianity to thousands of people who were baptised and joined the Church. He died at the age of 84 on 18 August 1899. CMS Bishop Edward Noel Hodges attended his funeral.

There are two Brethren assemblies in Mallappally: the Town Brethren assembly near Anima Ayurvedic Hospital, and the Mallappally North Assembly.

Mallappally is the birthplace of a large number of Kerala Bishops of many Christian denominations. Some of these are Saint Vattasseril Geevarghese Mar Dionysius, Archbishop Valakkuzhy Joseph Mar Severios, Bishop Modayil MC Mani, Evangeilical Bishop Panamootil PS Varghese, and Cardinal Baselios Cleemis.

Landmarks 

The Rev. George Mathan Mission Hospital, named after the well-known Malayalam writer and priest, Taluk Headquarters Hospital Mallappally, Govt Hospital Vaipur, serves as the medical center for the area

Other landmarks include the public bus stand and public stadium; both are on the west bank of the Manimala river.

Transportation 
Mallappally lies along SH 9, which connects the district capitals of Pathanamthitta and Kottayam. KSRTC travel between Kozhencherry and Kottayam, and Tiruvalla and Mallappally. Mallappally has a KSRTC depot, which is the main transportation facility on SH 9. The Thiruvalla–Mallappally road meets SH 9 at the central junction of the town. Mallappally is also connected to Ranni, Erumeli, and Sabarimala. A narrow road goes down to Anikkadu, a small farming village, a couple of kilometres away from town.
The nearest railway stations are at Tiruvalla (12 km), Changanacherry (15 km), Chengannur (20 km), and Kottayam (29 km).
The nearest airports are Cochin International Airport (100 km) and Trivandrum airport.

Festivals 
Every year during the summer months when the river water recedes, many sandy beds are formed in the middle of the river, large enough to hold conventions and festivals on. The Mallappally convention and the Shivarathri festival take place on two such large sandy patches near the Manimala Bridge across the river.
Thiruvulsavam held in Keezhvaipur Kizhakkedath Sree Subrahmania Swami temple,Vishu mahotsavam, held in the Pariyaram Sree-Krishna swami temple, are another old event. People from various parts of the Mallappally and Tiruvalla taluks come for the fest.

See also 
 Mallappally Taluk

Websites About Mallappally 
Mallappally References
Mallappally Live About Mallappally

References 

Cities and towns in Pathanamthitta district